Corporate nationalism is a phrase that is used to convey various meanings:
A political culture in which members believe the basic unit of society and the primary concern of the state is the corporate group rather than the individual, and the interests of the corporate group are the same as the interest of the nation.
Corporations should work mainly for the national good rather than the good of their owners.
Corporations should be protected from foreign ownership.
Corporations should or may be nationalized.
The state is biased towards corporate interests.

State should deal with corporations rather than individuals

"Corporate Nationalism" may be used to describe a political philosophy and economic theory whose adherents are corporatists and believe that the basic unit of the society, be it the family or other corporate groups, has  the same interests as the nation. Some therefore believe that the state should deal primarily with "corporations", which may include companies, worker's cooperatives, unions and so on, and allow these units to organize themselves to serve their members as they feel fit.

Corporations should work mainly for the national good

National corporations should be protected from foreign ownership
Norway has a history of state campaigns to block foreign companies from taking over major Norwegian firms. In 2005, PepsiCo was rumored to be planning a bid to take over French food group Danone, arousing popular outcry. A former boss of Danone said, "Danone is like Chartres cathedral, and one does not buy the cathedral of Chartres."

Corporations should (may) be nationalized

The phrase may be used to describe national intervention in corporations, including outright nationalization where the state assumes ownership of the corporation. Some see recent US government interventions in the Financial industry, including the effective nationalization of Fannie Mae and Freddie Mac are seen as a form of corporate nationalism.

The state is biased towards corporate interests

Some libertarians in the USA consider that the end of slavery coincided with the start of a regime "tainted" by aggressive corporate nationalism, or government intervention into the economy. In this view, the destruction of chattel slavery preserved and perpetuated "bourgeois" slavery.

See also
Corporatism
Corporate statism
Corporatocracy
Nationalism
Producerism
Corporatization 
Autocracy
Napoleon III
Benito Mussolini

References

Further reading
 
 Silk, Michael L., David L. Andrews, and C. L. Cole. Sport and Corporate Nationalisms (Sport Commerce and Culture)

Economic ideologies
Economic nationalism
Political theories
Corporatism